Baraghan (Persian: برغان, also romanized as Baraqān)  is a village in Baraghan Rural District of Chendar District, Savojbolagh County, Alborz province, Iran. At the 2006 census, the population was 378, in 139 households. The latest census in 2016 counted 470 people in 197 households; it is the largest village in its rural district.

Panoramic view

Gallery

References 

Savojbolagh County

Populated places in Alborz Province

Populated places in Savojbolagh County